Karla Hart is a writer, film-maker, dancer, actress and director and has been the event co-ordinator for Wardarnji Festival 2011- 2015,  is currently the Drive time presenter for Noongar Radio which broadcasts in Perth, Western Australia.

Education
Hart learnt traditional dance from Noongar elders, she also studied Aboriginal Theatre at the Western Australian Academy of Performing Arts before completing a Bachelor of Arts in Contemporary Performance at Edith Cowan University.

Work
Hart is currently Co Executive Producer and Shooter/Director on new NITV series in the making "Family Rules".
Hart has acted in acted, danced in a number of productions both on stage and in film & television, she also written plays and coordinated major events including the Wararnji Festival. She was a drive-time presenter for Noongar Radio for which she won a national award. Hart is also a board member of Yirra Yaakin Aboriginal Theatre Company which is an independent theatre company in Western Australia.

Kwarbah Djookian
In 2004 Hart started the Kwarbah Djookian Dance Group of which she also a performer, the group has performed at many major event both locally and internationally and hundreds of events such as festivals, schools, concerts and corporate events.

Works
Director
 Seasons series
 
Performances
 King Hit - played Belle and Kerry

Theatre writings 
Co-wrote and acted in Black as Michael Jackson 
Co-created Fifty Shades of Black

Screen writings
 Magic Quandong (2013) - winner WA Screen Awards 2013
 Sharing Caring
 Angela's Rules (2015)
 Meriny Time 
 Shit Noongars Say
 Shit Whitefellas Say - sequel to Shit Noongars Say
 Mobulator

References

Noongar people
Edith Cowan University alumni
Living people
Australian radio presenters
Australian women radio presenters
Year of birth missing (living people)